In cricket, a free hit is a delivery to a batter in which the batter cannot be dismissed by any methods other than those applicable for a no-ball, namely run out, hit the ball twice and obstructing the field.

It is relevant in One Day Internationals and Twenty20 matches. When a bowler bowls a no-ball, the immediate next ball is a free hit. Additionally, if the ball is delivered full toss above the waist the batter receives a free hit.

History
It came into international cricket in October 2007. Initially only foot fault no balls resulted in a free hit.

From 2015, the rules were changed so that all no balls result in a free hit.

Advantage gained
The opportunity afforded by a free hit ball enables the batter to play a more powerful shot without the fear of getting out by the most common methods (caught or leg before wicket). The fault lies with the fielding side, and the advantage is to the batting side. The only possible modes of dismissal on a free hit delivery are the same as those applicable on a no ball, viz. run out, obstructing the field and hit the ball twice.

If the batter is caught or bowled on a free hit delivery, the ball would still be in play and the batter can score runs. In case of bowled, the runs would be awarded to the batsman if the bat made contact with the ball before hitting the stumps; in case of clean bowled the runs are counted under byes. An instance of the latter happened in an ODI between India and England in January 2017, when Liam Plunkett clean bowled MS Dhoni off a free hit delivery and the ball rolled away to the boundary, giving India four byes.

Fielding restrictions
The fielding team is not allowed to change the field for the free hit ball, if the same batter (who received the original no-ball) is on strike. However, for safety reasons, if the wicketkeeper is standing up at the stumps they are allowed to move back to a more traditional position.

If the batters ran an odd number of runs on the original no-ball, the other batter is now the striker, and the field may be re-positioned for the free hit. In fact re-positioning is also allowed if the striker changes for whatever reason, for example if a new batter replaces a striker who is run out on the original no-ball, by failing to make his ground on the second run. The field must also be re-positioned if the no-ball was called for an illegal field placement.

Signal
The umpire at the bowler's end signals that the next ball is a free hit by making circular movements in the air with one raised hand. The free hit is carried over to the next ball if the original free hit ball is bowled wide or a no-ball; in this case the umpire is required to signal the free hit again.

References

Cricket terminology